Major James William Miller VC (5 May 1820 – 12 June 1892) was a Scottish recipient of the Victoria Cross, the highest and most prestigious award for gallantry in the face of the enemy that can be awarded to British and Commonwealth forces.

Details
Miller was about 37 years old, and a conductor in the Bengal Ordnance Depot, Bengal Army during the Indian Mutiny when the following deed took place on 28 October 1857 near Agra for which he was awarded the VC:

The VC award was gazetted on 25 February 1862, after a delay in obtaining the application for the medal from his senior officers.

He later achieved the rank of lieutenant, retired from the Gun Carriage Agency on 10 August 1882 as an honorary major, and died in Simla on 12 June 1892.

References

Monuments to Courage (David Harvey, 1999)
The Register of the Victoria Cross (This England, 1997)
Scotland's Forgotten Valour (Graham Ross, 1995)

External links
 In-depth look at his service

British recipients of the Victoria Cross
1820 births
1892 deaths
Indian Rebellion of 1857 recipients of the Victoria Cross
Military personnel from Glasgow
British East India Company Army soldiers
British Indian Army officers